Dhaurahra Lok Sabha constituency is one of the 80 Lok Sabha (parliamentary) constituencies in Uttar Pradesh state in northern India. This constituency, spread over Lakhimpur Kheri and Sitapur districts came into existence in 2008 as a part of the implementation of delimitation of parliamentary constituencies based on the recommendations of the Delimitation Commission of India constituted in 2002.

Assembly segments
Presently, Dhaurahra Lok Sabha constituency comprises five Vidhan Sabha (legislative assembly) segments. These are:

Members of Parliament

Election results

General elections 2019

See also
 Lakhimpur Kheri district
 List of Constituencies of the Lok Sabha

References

Lok Sabha constituencies in Uttar Pradesh
Politics of Lakhimpur Kheri district

mr:खेरी (लोकसभा मतदारसंघ)